Pacific Coast Railroad may refer to:
Pacific Coast Railway, a former narrow-gauge system near San Luis Obispo, California
Pacific Coast Railroad (Washington), a former line near Seattle
Pacific Coast Railroad (tourist) in Santa Margarita, California